The 2023 PDC Women's Series will consist of 24 darts tournaments on the 2023 PDC Pro Tour.

The top 8 ranked players, with money earned from the last 8 Women's Series events of 2022, and the first 12 events of 2023, will qualify for the 2023 Women's World Matchplay in Blackpool.

Prize money
On 21 November 2022, it was announced that the prize money for the Women's Series will be doubled in 2023, with each event now having a prize fund of £10,000.

This is how the prize money is divided:

February

Women's Series 1
Women's Series 1 was contested on Saturday 25 February 2023 at the Morningside Arena in Leicester. The event was won by Beau Greaves, who won her 9th consecutive title.

Women's Series 2
Women's Series 2 was contested on Saturday 25 February 2023 at the Morningside Arena in Leicester. The event was won by Beau Greaves, who won her 10th consecutive title.

Women's Series 3
Women's Series 3 was contested on Sunday 26 February 2023 at the Morningside Arena in Leicester. The event was won by Mikuru Suzuki.

Women's Series 4
Women's Series 4 was contested on Sunday 26 February 2023 at the Morningside Arena in Leicester. The event was won by Beau Greaves.

May

Women's Series 5
Women's Series 5 is to be contested on Saturday 13 May 2023 at the Marshall Arena in Milton Keynes.

Women's Series 6
Women's Series 6 is to be contested on Saturday 13 May 2023 at the Marshall Arena in Milton Keynes.

Women's Series 7
Women's Series 7 is to be contested on Sunday 14 May 2023 at the Marshall Arena in Milton Keynes.

Women's Series 8
Women's Series 8 is to be contested on Sunday 14 May 2023 at the Marshall Arena in Milton Keynes.

June

Women's Series 9
Women's Series 9 is to be contested on Saturday 24 June 2023 at Halle 39 in Hildesheim.

Women's Series 10
Women's Series 10 is to be contested on Saturday 24 June 2023 at Halle 39 in Hildesheim.

Women's Series 11
Women's Series 11 is to be contested on Sunday 25 June 2023 at Halle 39 in Hildesheim.

Women's Series 12
Women's Series 12 is to be contested on Sunday 25 June 2023 at Halle 39 in Hildesheim.

July

Women's Series 13
Women's Series 13 is to be contested on Saturday 29 July 2023 at the Marshall Arena in Milton Keynes.

Women's Series 14
Women's Series 14 is to be contested on Saturday 29 July 2023 at the Marshall Arena in Milton Keynes.

Women's Series 15
Women's Series 15 is to be contested on Sunday 30 July 2023 at the Marshall Arena in Milton Keynes.

Women's Series 16
Women's Series 16 is to be contested on Sunday 30 July 2023 at the Marshall Arena in Milton Keynes.

September

Women's Series 17
Women's Series 17 is to be contested on Saturday 16 September 2023 at the Robin Park Tennis Centre in Wigan.

Women's Series 18
Women's Series 18 is to be contested on Saturday 16 September 2023 at the Robin Park Tennis Centre in Wigan.

Women's Series 19
Women's Series 19 is to be contested on Sunday 17 September 2023 at the Robin Park Tennis Centre in Wigan.

Women's Series 20
Women's Series 20 is to be contested on Sunday 17 September 2023 at the Robin Park Tennis Centre in Wigan.

October

Women's Series 21
Women's Series 21 is to be contested on Saturday 14 October 2023 at the Robin Park Tennis Centre in Wigan.

Women's Series 22
Women's Series 22 is to be contested on Saturday 14 October 2023 at the Robin Park Tennis Centre in Wigan.

Women's Series 23
Women's Series 23 is to be contested on Sunday 15 October 2023 at the Robin Park Tennis Centre in Wigan.

Women's Series 24
Women's Series 24 is to be contested on Sunday 15 October 2023 at the Robin Park Tennis Centre in Wigan.

References

2023 in darts
2023 PDC Pro Tour
Women's Series